Anthony Joseph Testa (born 31 March 1987) is an American choreographer, creative director, educator and dancer.

Early life 
Testa started dancing at age eight in his hometown of Fort Collins, Colorado at Westin Arts Academy & Artistic Fusion Dance Academy. Testa married actress Stefania Spampinato in May 2018. The divorce was finalized in December 2020.

Career 
His career as a choreographer began when he made a demo reel using his mother's video camera. In 2002 Tony was picked by choreographer Brian Friedman to tour with Aaron Carter for his Jukebox tour. His demo reel was seen by Janet Jackson, who hired him to choreograph for her promotional tour that year.

Testa has choreographed for Britney Spears, and for Nickelodeon's Dance on Sunset (2008). In 2010 he began choreographing for Kylie Minogue on her "All The Lovers", "Better Than Today" and "Get Outta My Way" music videos. He was the associate director and choreographer for her Aphrodite: Les Folies Tour (2011).

Testa was hired by director Kenny Ortega as an associate choreographer for Michael Jackson's final tour This Is It, Dancing With The Stars featuring Corbin Bleu, The Rocky Horror Picture Show benefit for The Painted Turtle, and the remake of Dirty Dancing.

In November 2011, Testa co-directed the opening of the American Music Awards with Wade Robson. Later that year he served as the Creative Director for Season 1 of The Voice UK and for One Direction on Saturday Night Live (Season 37, Episode 18).

In 2012, Testa choreographed for the K-pop band Shinee in their music video "Sherlock (Clue + Note)", which earned the band  the award for Best Dance Performance Male Group at the 2012 Mnet Asian Music Awards. He choreographed the music videos and live performances for Shinee's "Dream Girl," "Everybody", and "Married to the Music" as well as TVXQ's "Catch Me" (known in Korea as "Hulk Dance") and "Something".

Testa choreographed Super Junior's "Mamacita" and "Super Clap". For Exo, Testa choreographed the band's "Wolf" and "Overdose". He was the art director for Exo's first solo concert The Lost Planet. He choreographed "Lion Heart" by Girls' Generation with Shim Jae-won, "Fire Truck", "My First and Last" and "Cherry Bomb" by NCT.

Testa is a dance educator for both the New York City Dance Alliance and Monsters Of Hip Hop dance conventions, and a guest speaker at the TEDx conference in Los Angeles in June 2013.

Choreography 
Concert tour for Demi Lovato - Choreographer (2011)
Promotional Concert Tour for Britney Spears. - Choreographer (2008) 
Promotional Concert Tour for the singer Janet Jackson and Nelly. Aired on NBC Today Show- Co-Choreographer (2006) 
Music Videos for the singer Kylie Minogue. Songs titled "Get Outta My Way" and "All the Lovers" - 2010 
Dance Spirit Magazine Article.(2008)

Director 
AMAs live performance by singer Nicki Minaj and DJ David Guetta - Co-Creative Director & Choreographer (20 November 2011)
Saturday Night Live for the band 1 Direction - Creative Director (7 April 2012)
The Voice UK - Season 1 - Creative Director (28 April - 3 May 2012)
Concert Tour for Kylie Minogue. Tour name: Aphrodite: Les Folies World Tour. - Associate Director & Choreographer (19 February 2011 – 14 July 2011) 
Leicester Square Theatre show for Polly Rae: The Hurly Burly Show. - Associate Director (2011)

References

External links

1987 births
Living people
American choreographers
American music video directors